Pterolophia inalbonotata is a species of beetle in the family Cerambycidae. It was described by Maurice Pic in 1945.

References

inalbonotata
Beetles described in 1945